The Adventures of Kesha and Macklemore is the co-headlining tour by American singer Kesha and American rapper Macklemore, in support of Kesha's third studio album Rainbow and Macklemore's second solo studio album Gemini, both released in 2017. The tour began in Phoenix on June 6, 2018, and ended in Tampa on August 5, 2018.

Background and development
On January 18, 2017, Macklemore posted a photo of him and Kesha together on Instagram, hinting at an upcoming collaboration. When the tracklist of Gemini was unveiled on August 22, 2017, it was revealed that Macklemore and Kesha have worked together on a track named "Good Old Days". The song was released as a promotional single on September 19, 2017, and was sent to adult contemporary radio on October 9, 2017, as the album's third single.

On December 11, 2017, Kesha and Macklemore released a video announcing a joint tour together in the summer of 2018. One dollar from each ticket purchase benefited charity. Kesha donated her proceeds to the anti-sexual assault organization Rape, Abuse & Incest National Network (RAINN), while Macklemore contributed to social and racial justice organization Plus1.

Set list 
This set list is from the show in Kansas City on June 26, 2018. It does not represent all concerts for the duration of the tour.

{{hidden
| headercss = background: #CECEF2; font-size: 100%; width: 95%;
| contentcss = text-align: left; font-size: 100%; width: 95%;
| header = Kesha
| content =
 "Woman"
 "Boogie Feet"
 "We R Who We R"
 "Good Old Days"
 "Bastards"
 "Jolene"
 "Timber"
 "Die Young"
 "Your Love Is My Drug"
 "Take It Off"
 "Blow"
 "Praying"
Encore
 "Tik Tok"
}}
{{hidden
| headercss = background: #CECEF2; font-size: 100%; width: 95%;
| contentcss = text-align: left; font-size: 100%; width: 95%;
| header = Macklemore
| content =
 "Ain't Gonna Die Tonight"
 "Thrift Shop"
 "White Walls"
 "Same Love"
 "Otherside"
 "Willy Wonka"
 "Dance Off"
 "Can't Hold Us"
 "Downtown"
Encore
 "Glorious"
}}

Tour dates

References

2018 concert tours
Co-headlining concert tours
Kesha concert tours